Cebu's 7th congressional district is one of the seven congressional districts of the Philippines in the province of Cebu. It was represented in the House of Representatives of the Philippines from 1916 to 1972, and again from the 2016 election onward. It was also earlier represented in the Philippine Assembly from 1907 to 1916. The district consists of the southwestern municipalities of Alcantara, Alegria, Badian, Dumanjug, Ginatilan, Malabuyoc, Moalboal and Ronda. It is currently represented in the 18th Congress by Peter John Calderon of the Nationalist People's Coalition (NPC).

Representation history

Election results

2019

2016

See also
Legislative districts of Cebu

References

Congressional districts of the Philippines
Politics of Cebu
1907 establishments in the Philippines
Congressional districts of Central Visayas
Constituencies established in 1907